Nerodimë e Poshtme or Donje Nerodimlje is an archaeological site and village situated west of the city of Ferizaj, Kosovo. Several archaeological trenches were investigated at this location in 1988 (which is close to the Orthodox cemetery).

Villa Complex 
The excavations resulted in the discovery of a villa complex that was possibly constructed during the Late Antique period. The villa was built around an atrium with a polychrome floor mosaic, using geometrical and figural motifs. According to researchers involved in the dig, the first phase was probably constructed during the 4th century AD, with reconstruction possibly taking place during the 5th and 6th century AD. The discovered floor mosaic is set within a rectangular room and an adjoining apse, which may have served as a triclinium (a dining room).

The mosaic in the villa complex at Nerodime e Poshtme is very similar in composition, style and construction techniques to a floor mosaic discovered in the Heraclea Lyncestis martyrium in North Macedonia, as well as a floor mosaic found in the Lin Basilica martyrium in Albania. The similarities between the mosaics at these three sites suggest that they are all the work of a great unknown artist/master of that time.

Churches
Church of St. Nicholas, Donje Nerodimlje
Church of St. Stephen, Donje Nerodimlje

See also
Roman Dardania
Roman cities in Illyria
Archaeology of Kosovo
Roman Period Sites in Kosovo
Neolithic Sites in Kosovo
Copper, Bronze and Iron Age Sites in Kosovo
Late Antiquity and Medieval Sites in Kosovo

Notes 
Notes'

References 

Moesia
Dardania (Roman province)
Roman towns and cities in Kosovo
Archaeological sites in Kosovo
Villages in Ferizaj